Henri Guybet (born 21 December 1936) is a French actor. He has appeared in more than one hundred films since 1964.

Guybet started his career in dinner theater in the Café de la Gare, alongside Coluche and Miou-Miou in late 1960s. Gérard Oury gave him his first major film role in The Mad Adventures of Rabbi Jacob, where he plays Solomon, the Jewish driver of Louis de Funès. His comic talent explodes shortly after with Georges Lautner in Pas de Problème. In 1978 he got the leading role in the film The Pawn, where he played Bertrand Barabi a "pawn" who falls in love for the mother of one of his students, played by Claude Jade. This was his only romantic role and his only lead. In the late 1970s, he made several "nanars" and became a second recurring role. In theater, he became a big name in boulevard theater.

His son is also an actor.

Selected filmography
1971: The Married Couple of the Year Two
1973: The Mad Adventures of Rabbi Jacob
1974: Lucky Pierre
1974: The Return of the Tall Blond Man with One Black Shoe
1975: Flic Story
1978: The Pawn
1978: Surprise Sock
1978: One Two Two
1979: Heroes Are Not Wet Behind the Ears
1980: Le Guignolo
1981: Schools Falling Apart
1982: Le Cadeau
1984: Dog Day
1987: Club de rencontres
2002: If I Were a Rich Man

References

External links 

1936 births
Living people
French male film actors
Café de la Gare